Ollo Kambou (born 1986 in Bingerville, Cote d'Ivoire) is a footballer who started his career when he joined Stade d'Abidjan, a team in the Division 1 Championship in Cote d'Ivoire, in 2004. He played left back for Stade until 2005, when his contract ended.

He was then taken on by another Division 1 team, Séwé Sport de San Pedro, when they asked him to sign at the beginning of 2006. He continued playing left back for San Pedro until his contract ended the following year, 2007.

By the end of 2007 Stade d'Abidjan realized how much value he added to their team and invited him back as left back. He continued with Stade from early 2008 to the beginning of 2009, when he received an invitation to play for Yadanarbon FC, a team representing Mandalay, Myanmar. He was liberated and went to Myanmar in April 2009 to play in the first official season of the Myanmar National League.

Though he was originally on the roster to play in the 2008 Ivorian Olympic team, he did not end up participating.

He played left back with Yadanarbon FC, wearing jersey number 3 from 2009 to 2011.

At the end of 2011, Kambou was asked to sign with Manaw Myay FC, a team representing the Kachin State in Northern Myanmar. He remained with this team, wearing jersey number 5, as left wing and midfielder until November 2015.

Accomplishments

Champion of the Asian Federation Cup (AFC) Stage Group, 2010
Three time Champion of the Myanmar National League, 2009, 2009, 2010
Eliminated in the 2nd Round of the CAF Champions League, 2007
Participated in the UEMOA (Union Économique et Monétaire Ouest-African (Economic and Monetary Union of West Africa)) Cup in Mali on Ivory Coast's National Hope Team U23, 2007
Eliminated in the 2nd Round of the CAF Cup, 2006
Vice Champion of the Ivory Coast, 2006
Winner of the Coupe Houphouët-Boigny, 2005
Ivory Coast Junior National Team in Benin (CAN – Coupe d'Afrique Nation Juniors (African National Cup Junior)), 2005 (See 2005 African Youth Championship squads)
Finalist in the Felix Houphouet Boigny Cup, 2004

See also
2005 African Youth Championship squads
:fr:Coupe de la confederation 2006
:fr:Championnat de Côte d'Ivoire de football 2006
:fr:Super Coupe Félix Houphouët-Boigny

References 

1986 births
Living people
Ivorian footballers
Association football fullbacks
People from Bingerville